5-Hydroxycytosine is an oxidized form of cytosine that is associated with an increased frequency of C to T transition mutations, with some C to G transversions. It does not distort the DNA molecule and is readily bypassed by replicative DNA polymerases.

It has been shown in vitro to miscode for adenine.

5-hydroxycytosine is imperative for parallel DNA triplex formation, explaining why parallel triplexes form only at pH 6 and below.

References

Pyrimidones
Nucleobases